Krasnoznamenka is a rural locality (a selo) in and the administrative center of Krasnoznamensky Selsoviet, Kuryinsky District, Altai Krai, Russia. The population was 904 as of 2013. There are 14 streets.

Geography 
Krasnoznamenka is located 13 km north of Kurya (the district's administrative centre) by road. Novoznamenka is the nearest rural locality.

References 

Rural localities in Kuryinsky District